Bronnegerveen is a hamlet in the Dutch province of Drenthe. It is a part of the municipality of Borger-Odoorn, and lies about 19 km east of Assen.

The hamlet was first mentioned in 1936 as Bronnegerveen, and means "peat excavation village near Bronneger". The settlement started around 1750. A century later, it became a peat excavation village.

References

Populated places in Drenthe
Borger-Odoorn